Catoptria brachyrhabda is a moth in the family Crambidae. It was described by George Hampson in 1906. It is found in Sikkim, India.

References

Crambini
Moths described in 1906
Moths of Asia